is a fictional character in the Street Fighter video game series. He was first mentioned in 1991's Street Fighter II: The World Warrior, in which he is established to be a deceased friend of Guile who was killed by M. Bison prior to the events of the game's tournament. He made his first appearance as a playable fighter in 1995's Street Fighter Alpha: Warriors' Dreams, although he has appeared in Street Fighter related media with varying character designs prior to debuting in the games. He is characterized as a member of the United States Air Force charged with finding M. Bison, and destroying his organization Shadaloo. As a playable character, his fighting style is similar to Guile's, sharing some of his signature special moves such as the Sonic Boom and the Somersault Kick (aka Justice Shell (SFV) or Somersault Shell). An alternate version of the character named Shadow also makes recurring appearances in related media.

Nash has received a positive reception from players and video game journalists, and is considered to be an important part of the Street Fighters canon.

Creation and development
The name change was done following a suggestion by a staff member in Capcom's U.S. subsidiary who felt that "Nash" was not natural sounding enough for American players to relate to. The two names would later be combined in certain licensed Street Fighter media - particularly Udon's comic book series - to form the full name "Charlie Nash", which was officially adopted by the games starting with Street Fighter IV. As a result, Street Fighter V was the first game to abandon the usual practice of changing the character's name to "Charlie" in overseas versions, referring to him primarily as "Nash" in every region.

Nash is first mentioned by Guile, one of the playable fighters in Street Fighter II and its subsequent revisions, where his motive for entering the tournament is to confront the tournament's host M. Bison for an incident in Cambodia that involved him, Bison, and Charlie Nash. Subsequent sequels in the series fleshed out his backstory, where he is the military comrade and close friend of Guile, who is looking to avenge the death of his friend who was killed by Bison sometime before the events of the game.

Since the Street Fighter Alpha series, Nash has been depicted as a military operative who wears green cargo pants and a yellow jacket, as well as a pair of glasses which he takes off before a fight. He has a hairstyle consisting of a large forelock of blond hair. Charlie has been depicted with drastically different character designs in his appearances in licensed Street Fighter media prior to his official Alpha debut. His appearance in Street Fighter V is similar to his Alpha design, although a few very noticeable changes have been implemented. He now sports faded, green-colored skin grafts that are stapled on and cover a portion of the right side of his face, the majority of his right arm and a portion of the right side of his chest. His attire has also gained a darker coloration, with his pants now being a dark brown color and part of his vest becoming darker too. Lastly, he has gained a green gem embedded in his forehead.

Gameplay
For Nash's debut appearance in Street Fighter Alpha, his moves are based on Guile's, making him as a similar figure as Ken to Ryu, and his Somersault Kick is more powerful than Guile's. Due to Nash's apparent resurrection in Street Fighter V where he almost seems possessed by a "mysterious power", his attacks and special moves for the game reflect that change; he no longer possess many of the special moves which are thematically similar to Guile's, and both characters play quite differently. In Street Fighter V, Nash appears to perform similarly to the Street Fighter IV iteration of Guile. He is considered to be a character for players who like to switch it up on their opponents and keep the pressure on, as he had the most flexible normal attacks in the game. Edward Dang from Hardcore Gamer opined that an experienced Nash player would understand what moves Nash can chain together and being prepared for defense. Nash also has the ability to steal HP and Critical Art meter, which is used for EX attacks and the character’s super attack, the Critical Art.

Appearances

In video games
Nash first appears as a playable character in Street Fighter Alpha, a prequel to Street Fighter II, where he is a first lieutenant in the United States Air Force, assigned to track down Bison and uncover corruption within the American military. Because the events of the Alpha series precede Street Fighter II, Charlie's ending sequence in the original Alpha, as well as in Street Fighter Alpha 2, both end with him being killed after defeating Bison: in Alpha, Bison attacks him from behind when he calls for backup and in Alpha 2, a corrupt officer piloting his intended backup helicopter shoots him for Bison and sends him falling down a waterfall. Street Fighter Alpha 3 was initially the sole exception to this convention, which actually has Charlie surviving in his ending, although the later console versions, which adds Guile as a playable fighter, has Charlie's death depicted in Guile's ending instead. His death scene in Alpha 2, however, is treated by Street Fighter V as canon, making Charlie's appearance in Alpha 3 semi-canonical (As his bio in Alpha 3 states his objective in Alpha 2)

Despite Nash's apparent death in the Alpha series, Street Fighter IV would provide hints of his survival in the game's storyline. This would lead to his eventual return as a playable fighter in Street Fighter V,  which reveals that he underwent reconstructive surgery after he was mortally wounded by M. Bison, leaving him with stitches across his body and head with gray, dead-like patches of skin, as well as a green jewel on his forehead. It is actually the work of Illuminati, the main antagonist of Street Fighter III series, and his revival project was headed by Kolin (under a guise as Helen), using the body sample Twelve's prototype version, Eleven, created by Urien. After being revived, Nash's lifespan is limited, as Nash must save his energy to confront Bison in their final battle. Nash sacrifices his life on attempting a suicide mission by absorbing Bison's powers as much as he can, weakening Bison long enough for Ryu to finish the warlord once and for all with the Power of Nothingness. Despite this sacrifice, Capcom has officially listed Nash's life status as unknown.

Charlie also appears as a playable fighter in X-Men vs. Street Fighter and Marvel vs. Capcom 2, as well as in the unreleased Capcom Fighting All-Stars.  Outside his usual fighting game appearances, Charlie is a playable character in the shoot 'em up game Cannon Spike alongside fellow Street Fighter character Cammy. An alternate version of Charlie named Shadow appears as a hidden character in the crossover game, Marvel Super Heroes vs. Street Fighter. Shadow's sprite is the same as Charlie's, but with almost his entire body blacked out and a white eye shining behind his glasses. He has all of Charlie's moves, but his attacks set his opponent alight with blue "Psycho Power" flames. Shadow also appears in Marvel vs. Capcom as a side character that can assist the player in combat, and is featured in the ending sequences for Chun-Li and Shadow Lady, a robot version of Chun-Li. In Street Fighter V, Shadow appeared in the Extra Battle mode.

In Super Smash Bros. Ultimate, Nash appears as a spirit in the adventure mode.

In other media

Live-action
In the 1994 film adaptation Street Fighter, Charlie is amalgamated with the character of Blanka to form the character Carlos "Charlie" Blanka, a Brazilian friend of Colonel Guile and a soldier in his unit, who is taken prisoner in Bison's Shadaloo compound. When Bison discovers the friendship between Charlie and Guile through one of Guile's threats, he sends Charlie to be brainwashed and mutated by Dr. Dhalsim (Bison's unwilling scientist in this film) to become the green-skinned, red-haired killing machine known simply as Blanka. Dhalsim, however, secretly changes Blanka's mental programming to prevent him from becoming a killer. During a scuffle between Dhalsim and the lab guard, Blanka is released prematurely and his first act is to murder the guard to save Dhalsim. He later attacks Guile when he sneaks into the lab, but recognises him as his friend. He is almost shot by Guile in order to end his suffering, but Dhalsim stops him on the grounds that Blanka is essentially still himself. Blanka and Dhalsim later fight Bison's forces together when the AN army attacks Bison's base. In the climax, however, Blanka refuses to return to civilization with Guile in his state, choosing to perish in the explosion of Bison's base along with a repentant Dhalsim. In the console version of the Street Fighter: The Movie video game, Blanka is a playable fighter, though in his mutated incarnation with the original Blanka's moveset. His ending reveals that he and Dhalsim both survived the explosion and Dhalsim eventually reverted him to his human form. Unused assets suggests that he was also going to be a playable fighter in the arcade version. In the film, he is portrayed by Australian actor Robert Mammone, and by stuntman Kim Repia in the video game.

Charlie Nash is played by Chris Klein in Street Fighter: The Legend of Chun-Li, where he is portrayed as a member of Interpol.

Nash is a central character in the miniseries Street Fighter: Resurrection portrayed by Alain Moussi.

Animation
Though he does not physically appear in the film, Charlie is alluded to several times in Street Fighter II: The Animated Movie. Dialogue reveals that prior to the film's events, he was killed by Bison, and now serves as Guile's primary motive for personal revenge against the warlord. Though sympathetic towards Guile for losing Charlie, Chun-Li successfully persuades Guile to put his personal vendetta aside and help Interpol fight Shadaloo. Guile later attempts to fight Bison, who openly mocks Charlie to provoke him before defeating him but sparing him as an insult. As the film predated the development of Street Fighter Alpha, Charlie is never referred to by name, but as "Guile's friend" or "Guile's best friend".

The 1995 anime television series Street Fighter II V, Nash first appears in episode 19, when he and Guile are hired by Ken's father to rescue him from Bison. Nash is later killed off in episode 26 after Bison strangles him to death. He retains the name "Nash" for the English dub, although Guile calls him "Charlie" just before his death in episode 26, and the narrator refers to him as "Charlie Nash". As the series was produced while Street Fighter Alpha was still in its earliest development stages, Charlie bears no resemblance to his video game counterpart, instead sporting slicked brown hair and a beard, vaguely similar to actor Jean Reno.

The American Street Fighter animated series, which aired from 1995 to 1997, adapts Blanka's origin from the 1994 film, combining Charlie and Blanka into one character as well. While Blanka is usually depicted in his mutated form throughout the series, his original human form is briefly shown during a flashback in the episode "The Medium is the Message", in which he dresses exactly like the Street Fighter Alpha version of Charlie, but with a color scheme much closer to Blanka's (a green vest and a brown pair of cargo pants), anklets instead of boots. and a pair of shades instead of eyeglasses. Charlie's hair color and skin tone was also changed to suit the character's different ethnicity in the show. In "Eye of the Beholder", Blanka temporarily regains his human form after being subjected to an experimental serum, only to return to his mutant form by the end of the episode.

Comics
In Masaomi Kanzaki's manga adaptation of Street Fighter II, Guile is directly responsible for Charlie's death. Years before the events of the manga, Bison uses Charlie and other members of Guile's unit as unknowing test subjects for a mind-controlling substance. Charlie went insane during a mission and began attacking unarmed villagers, causing Guile to kill him. Charlie is only shown in one panel in the manga, which depicts him as a silhouette with an insane smile.

In the American Street Fighter comic book series, Charlie's Japanese name is made into his surname, giving him the full name of Charlie Nash. The comic goes on to include that it was in fact Charlie who taught Guile how to use the "Sonic Boom" technique, and indeed how to fight. Udon would also include Shadow as part of the comic's storyline: Bison captures Charlie, turns him into Shadow, using him as an agent. He tries to have Shadow kill Guile and Chun Li in Japan, but Charlie regains his memory in the fight and runs off. He later attempts to rejoin his friends, but is gunned down by Bison's helicopter. With the last of his strength, Charlie sacrifices himself by using his Somersault Justice to destroy the cliff on which they were fighting, sending both Bison and himself plunging into the sea. He also has a new comic called Street Fighter V: The Life and Deaths of Charlie Nash that explains what happened to him prior to Street Fighter V and why he looks the way he does.

Ariga Hitoshi's manga series Rockman Remix and Rockman Megamix, set in the Mega Man universe, features the character as a newscaster in several chapters. The character is referred by his overseas name "Charlie" instead of Nash. In Hi Score Girl anime series, Charlie appears in episode 10 (along with a voice), when Haruo was about to play Street Fighter Alpha.

Reception
The character was well received by critics and fans of the series. In 2008, D. F. Smith of IGN ranked Charlie as 16th on their list of top Street Fighter fighters. He was ranked as 26th top Street Fighter character by Paul Furfari of UGO in 2010. That same year, European Street Fighter champion Ryan Hart ranked Charlie as the tenth best Street Fighter character. Heavy.com included him among top ten characters they wanted in Ultra Street Fighter IV, adding that he "has been a constant fan request for a while now." In the official poll by Namco, Charlie has been the 21st most requested Street Fighter side character to be added to the roster of Tekken X Street Fighter, as of August 2012 raking up 5.20% of votes. In 2016, Korean player Infiltration used Charlie to win the Street Fighter V tournaments at EVO, Final Round, NorCal Regionals, and Red Bull Kumite.

The character's fate and recurring experiences of death or near-death has received particular attention. Gavin Jasper from Den of Geek and Chris Plante from The Verge described Nash as the Kenny McCormick of the Street Fighter media franchise, while Femi Famutimi from WePlay considered him to be the series' most tragic character. Bryan Dawson from Prima Games said Charlie Nash has always been a "tortured soul" in the Street Fighter media franchise, and that he often takes a backseat to Guile even though he has a substantial fanbase.

References

Action film characters
Fictional American people in video games
Fictional lieutenants
Fictional United States Air Force personnel
Fictional United States Marine Corps personnel
Fictional characters with post-traumatic stress disorder
Fictional special forces personnel
Fictional martial artists in video games
Fictional MCMAP practitioners
Male characters in video games
Street Fighter characters
Fictional soldiers in video games
Video game characters introduced in 1995
Video game characters who can teleport